Nippon Marathon is a party, action, racing game developed by British studio  Onion Soup Interactive and published by PQube Limited.



Reception
According to review aggregator Metacritic, Nippon Marathon received mixed to unfavourable critic reviews for PlayStation 4, Xbox One and Nintendo Switch, with the PC release currently having no score.

Nintendo Life gave the Switch release a 6/10 calling the visuals and nature of the physics "an acquired taste", however praised the multiplayer and recommended it to anyone looking for a "silly party game".

The game holds a very high rating on Steam, with a 90% "very positive" overall rating as of October 2020.

References

External links
 

2018 video games
MacOS games
Multiplayer and single-player video games
Nintendo Switch games
Party video games
PlayStation 4 games
Video games developed in the United Kingdom
Windows games
Xbox One games
PQube games